Muqaylibah  is a Syrian village located in Markaz Rif Dimashq District, Rif Dimashq. According to the Syria Central Bureau of Statistics (CBS), Muqaylibah had a population of 5,022 in the 2004 census. To its north are Marana, Kawkab, and the 100th Regiment Base, to its east is al-Kiswah, to its south is Al-Taybah and to its west are Deir Khabiyah and Zakiyah.

History
In 1838, Eli Smith noted Muqaylibah's population as being Sunni Muslims.

References

Bibliography

 

Populated places in Markaz Rif Dimashq District